John Martin (1882 – after 1911) was an English professional footballer who scored 55 goals from 122 appearances in the Football League playing as a centre forward for Lincoln City and Blackburn Rovers. He also played Southern League football for Brighton & Hove Albion and Millwall Athletic and in the North-Eastern League for Hartlepools United.

Life and career
Martin was born in 1882 in South Shields, County Durham. He played football for Tyne Dock N.E.R., from which he joined Wearside League club Kingston Villa ahead of the 1902–03 season. He spent two seasons with the club, and was selected for a Wearside League representative team in 1904, before moving into the Football League with Lincoln City.

He made his debut on 3 September 1904 in a 2–0 win away to Doncaster Rovers in the Second Division. In the following season, Martin was the club's leading scorer, with 20 goals from League and FA Cup games. This earned him a transfer to the First Division with Blackburn Rovers. In his second, he faced competition for the centre-forward position, and a poorer goal return left the player reportedly unhappy with both himself and the club.

He spent the 1908–09 season with Brighton & Hove Albion, where he scored 18 goals from 37 Southern League appearances. He then played for Millwall Athletic, where he led the Lions in scoring in the 1909–10 and 1910–11 seasons, with 12 goals from 39 and 31 matches respectively, before returning to the north-east to spend the 1911–12 season with Hartlepools United of the North Eastern League.

References

1882 births
Year of death missing
Footballers from South Shields
English footballers
Association football forwards
Kingston Villa F.C. players
South Shields F.C. (1889) players
Lincoln City F.C. players
Blackburn Rovers F.C. players
Brighton & Hove Albion F.C. players
Millwall F.C. players
Hartlepool United F.C. players
English Football League players
Southern Football League players